Gregory Peterson (born February 18, 1960) is a Canadian former gridiron football player who played in the Canadian Football League (CFL) for nine years. Peterson played defensive back for the Calgary Stampeders from 1984 to 1992. He was part of the Stampeders 1992 Grey Cup winning team. Peterson was an All-Star in 1990. He played college football at Brigham Young University and high school football at Dr. E.P. Scarlett.

Following retirement in 1993, Peterson began a career in law, and is currently a partner at law firm Gowlings, specialising in business law. Peterson is also a Stampeder radio commentator, and president of the Greater Calgary Amateur Football Association.

He is the brother of NHL player and coach Brent Peterson.

References

1960 births
Living people
BYU Cougars football players
Calgary Stampeders players
Canadian football defensive backs
Canadian Football League announcers
Canadian football people from Calgary
Players of Canadian football from Alberta
Canadian expatriate sportspeople in the United States